Leptospira meyeri is a saprophytic species of Leptospira.

References

Further reading

External links
Type strain of Leptospira meyeri at BacDive -  the Bacterial Diversity Metadatabase

meyeri
Bacteria described in 1987